The 1986 NCAA Division III women's basketball tournament was the fifth annual tournament hosted by the NCAA to determine the national champion of Division III women's collegiate basketball in the United States.

Salem State defeated Bishop in the championship game, 89–85, to claim the Vikings' first Division III national title.

The championship rounds were hosted in Salem, Massachusetts.

Bracket
First Round (round of 32)
 NYU 70, Buffalo St. 65
 Albany (NY) 74, Columbia 67
 Salem St. 58, Bridgewater St. 47
 Emmanuel (MA) 59, Southern Me. 50
 St. Norbert 77, Susquehanna 63
 Wis.-Whitewater 71, Alma 65
 Rust 74, Chris. Newport 43
 UNC Greensboro 84, Va. Wesleyan 75
 Elizabethtown 70, Moravian 64
 Scranton 70, Juniata 53
 Kean 68, Ohio Northern 64
 Capital 84, Allegheny 66
 Eastern Conn. St. 71, Elmhurst 68
 William Penn 80, Carroll (WI) 68
 Bishop 83, Pomona-Pitzer 57
 Concordia-M’head 67, Saint Mary’s (MN) 63

Regional Finals (round of sixteen)
 Albany (NY) 68, NYU 66
 Salem St. 77, Emmanuel (MA) 60
 Wis.-Whitewater 57, St. Norbert 56
 Rust 99, UNC Greensboro 61
 Elizabethtown 74, Scranton 60
 Capital 72, Kean 71 (OT)
 William Penn 75, Eastern Conn. St. 59
 Bishop 90, Concordia-M’head 86

Elite Eight

All-tournament team
 Evelyn Oquendo, Salem State
 Beth Kapnis, Salem State
 Crystal Coleman, Bishop
 Batavia Evans, Bishop
 Mary Fuhr, Capital

See also
1986 NCAA Division III men's basketball tournament
1986 NCAA Division I women's basketball tournament
1986 NCAA Division II women's basketball tournament
1986 NAIA women's basketball tournament

References

 
NCAA Division III women's basketball tournament
1986 in sports in Wisconsin